Hühnerberg may refer to:

Hühnerberg (Swabia), a mountain of Bavaria, Germany
Hühnerberg (Lommersdorf), a mountain in the Ahr Hills, in the Eifel region, Germany 
Hühnerberg (Kirchsahr), a mountain in the Ahr Hills, in the Eifel region, Germany
Hühnerberg (Taunus), a mountain in the Rheingau-Taunus-Kreis, Taunus region, Hesse, Germany

See also
Hünerberg, a mountain in the Hochtaunuskreis, Taunus region, Hesse, Germany